Déjanire  is an opera (tragédie lyrique) in 4 acts composed by Camille Saint-Saëns to a libretto in French by Louis Gallet and Camille Saint-Saëns. The last of Saint-Saëns' operas, it premiered on 28 August 1898 in the new arènes in Beziers. One of the opera's central characters, Hercule (Hercules), had been the subject of two earlier symphonic poems by Saint-Saëns – Le Rouet d'Omphale (1872) and La Jeunesse d'Hercule (1877). The story is based on The Trachiniae by Sophocles (also the source for Handel's opera Hercules).

Composition history
Déjanire began its life in 1898 as a play with accompanying symphonic music, choruses and a ballet. Fernand Castelbon de Beauxhostes, one of the owners of a newly constructed arena in Béziers (used primarily for staging bullfights), wanted to make Béziers a centre for the performance of open-air opera as well. He persuaded Saint-Saëns to write the score for a performance of Louis Gallet's epic verse-drama Déjanire to inaugurate the project.

At first Saint-Saëns was reluctant to have his music performed in what he called an "abominable temple of blood". However, Castelbon managed to convince him by inviting him to visit the arena where his arrival was greeted by hidden musicians playing in his honour. In August 1898 Déjanire opened in Béziers with two performances before 12,000 spectators each time. The reception was ecstatic with Saint-Saëns conducting a huge musical ensemble consisting of a choir of hundreds, massed military bands and an orchestra that included 18 harps and an array of 25 trumpets. Although fatally ill and suffering from deafness, Louis Gallet managed to attend the second performance. In his memoirs Saint-Saëns recalled:

In spite of everything, including his ill health which made the trip very painful, he wanted to see his work once more. He heard nothing, however – neither the artists, the choruses, nor even the applause of the several thousand spectators who encored it enthusiastically. A little later he passed on, leaving in his friends' hearts and at the work-tables of his collaborators a void which it is impossible to fill.

Twelve years later, Saint-Saëns transformed Gallet's play into a fully-fledged opera to fulfill a commission from the Opéra de Monte-Carlo. Gabriel Fauré was in the audience for its world premiere on 14 March 1911, conducted by Léon Jehin and directed by Raoul Gunsbourg.

Performance history
The first performance was given on 28 August 1898 in the arena at Béziers, with Saint-Saëns conducting, in front of an audience of 8000. The following year it was performed again, this time with Gabriel Fauré conducting and Saint-Saëns in the audience. Following the Monte Carlo premiere, the work was performed at the Paris Opera on 22 November 1911. (The Paris premiere caused a minor scandal when Mlle. Delsaux danced the ballet segment with bare legs and clad only in "flimsy draperies" instead of the traditional bell-shaped skirt.)

The first performance of Déjanire in the United States came on 9 December 1915 when it was presented by the Chicago Opera Association with Carmen Melis and Lucien Muratore in the leading roles. Although very rarely performed today, Déjanire was revived at the Festival de Radio France et Montpellier in a 1985 performance conducted by Serge Baudo.

Synopsis
Place: Trachis
Time: Ancient Greece

Hercule has killed King Eurytus, and sacked the city of Oechalia with the intention of taking the king's beautiful daughter, Iole as his bride. The task of informing Iole of the impending marriage falls to Philoctète, who is actually her lover. Iole confesses her love for Philoctète to Hercule and must now marry him to save Philoctète's life. Meanwhile, Phénice tries to convince Hercule's wife, Déjanire, to leave him forever. Instead, the desperate Déjanire tries in vain to win back her husband. When this fails, she decides to help Iole by giving her  a tunic impregnated with the blood of Nessus. Before he died, Nessus had told Déjanire that his blood had magic powers to make the unfaithful return. What Déjanire does not know is that the blood is actually tainted with a terrible poison. Iole gives the tunic to Hercule on their wedding day. When he puts on the fatal gift, he is overcome by an excruciating burning pain. In agony he throws himself into the flames of the wedding pyre and dying ascends to Mount Olympus.

Recordings
The tenor aria, "Viens, O toi dont le clair visage", from Déjanire can be heard on Antonio Paoli – Il Mito Dell'opera (Bongiovanni #1117).
Concert performance and world premiere recording in December 2020 at the Prinzregententheater, Munich by the Münchner Rundfunkorchester in collaboration with the Palazzetto Bru Zane was cancelled due to the corona pandemic.

References
Notes

Sources

Festival de Radio France et Montpellier,  Camille Saint-Saëns: Déjanire, 9 July 1985. Accessed 24 February 2009.
Fournier, Michel. Béziers, Bayreuth français In: La révolte du Midi viticole cent ans après, 1907-2007 [online]. Perpignan: Presses universitaires de Perpignan, 2008 (generated 21 août 2021). Available on the Internet: http://books.openedition.org/pupvd/23927, .
Gelli, Piero (ed.), "Déjanire" in Dizionario dell'Opera, Baldini Castoldi Dalai, 2007, . Accessed online 27 February 2009.
Hero, Florian, "Saint-Saëns en plein vent", Maison de la Radio, 9 June 2021.
Lahee, Henry Charles, Annals of Music in America, Marshall Jones Co., 1922. Accessed 24 February 2009.
Macdonald, Hugh, "Déjanire", Grove Music Online ed. L. Macy (Accessed 24 February 2009), (subscription access).
Molénat, Jacques, La movida de Béziers, L'Express, 10 August 2000. Accessed 24 February 2009.
The New York Times, Dances Shocked Paris; Flimsy Draperies Now Barred, 17 December 1911. Accessed 24 February 2009.
Rees, Brian, A proposal: Saint-Saens - the movie, The Independent, 22 February 1999. Accessed 24 February 2009.
Saint-Saëns, Camille, Musical Memories (in English translation by Edwin Gile Rich), Small, Maynard & Co., 1919. Accessed 24 February 2009.

External links

Operas
Operas by Camille Saint-Saëns
French-language operas
1911 operas
Opera world premieres at the Opéra de Monte-Carlo
Operas based on classical mythology
Operas based on works by Sophocles